Illinois Township is one of thirty-seven townships in Washington County, Arkansas, USA. As of the 2000 census, its total population was 655.

Illinois Township was established in 1829.

Geography

Cities, towns, villages
Cincinnati

Cemeteries
The township contains Beatty Cemetery, Harold Cemetery, Norwood Cemetery and Old Union Cemetery.

Major routes
  Arkansas Highway 59
  Arkansas Highway 244

References

 United States National Atlas

External links
 US-Counties.com
 City-Data.com

Townships in Washington County, Arkansas
Populated places established in 1829
Townships in Arkansas
Arkansas placenames of Native American origin